Ramesh Chandra Majumdar (known as R. C. Majumdar; 4 December 1888 – 11 February 1980) was a historian and professor of Indian history. Majumdar is a noted historian of modern India. He was a former Sheriff of Kolkata.

Early life and education
Coming from a Baidya family, Majumdar was born in Khandarpara, Gopalganj, Bengal Presidency, British India (now in Bangladesh) on 4 December 1888, to Haladhara Majumdar and Bidhumukhi. In 1905, he passed his Entrance Examination from Ravenshaw College, Cuttack. In 1907, he passed F.A. with first class scholarship from Surendranath College and joined Presidency College, Calcutta. Graduating in B.A.(Honours) and M.A. from Calcutta University in 1909 and 1911, respectively, he won the Premchand Roychand scholarship from the University of Calcutta for his research work in 1913.

Career
Majumdar started his teaching career as a lecturer at Dacca Government Training College. Since 1914, he spent seven years as a professor of history at the University of Calcutta. He got his doctorate for his thesis "Corporate Life in Ancient India". In 1921 he became professor of history in newly established University of Dacca. He also served, until he became its Vice Chancellor, as the head of the Department of History as well as the dean of the Faculty of Arts. Between 1924 and 1936 he was Provost of Jagannath Hall. Then he became the Vice Chancellor of that University, for five years from 1937 to 1942. From 1950, he was Principal of the College of Indology, Benares Hindu University. He was elected the general president of the Indian History Congress and also became the vice president of the International Commission set up by the UNESCO for the history of mankind.

Works
Majumdar started his research on ancient India. After extensive travels to Southeast Asia and research, he wrote detailed histories of Champa (1927), Suvarnadvipa (1938) and Kambuja Desa (1944). On the initiative of Bharatiya Vidya Bhavan, he took up the mantle of editing a multi-volume tome on Indian history. Starting in 1951, he toiled for twenty-six long years to describe the history of the Indian people from the Vedic Period until the Independence of India in eleven volumes. In 1955, Majumdar established the College of Indology of Nagpur University and joined as Principal. In 1958–59, he taught Indian history in the University of Chicago and University of Pennsylvania. He was also the president of the Asiatic Society (1966–68) and the Bangiya Sahitya Parishad (1968–69), and also the Sheriff of Calcutta (1967–68).

When the final volume of "The History and Culture of the Indian People" was published in 1977, he had turned eighty-eight. He also edited the three-volume history of Bengal published by Dacca University. His last book was "Jivaner Smritidvipe".

The proposal to write on "Freedom movement" with Government sponsorship was put forth by in 1948 by R. C. Majumdar. In 1952 the ministry of education appointed Board of Editors for the compilation of the History. Professor Majumdar was appointed by the Board as the Director and entrusted with the work of sifting and collecting materials and preparing the draft of the history. However, the Board as consisting of politicians and scholars, was least likely to function harmoniously. Perhaps this was the reason why it was dissolved at the end of 1955. The scheme remained in balance for a year until the government decided to transfer the work on to a single scholar. To the disappointment of Professor Majumdar the choice of the ministry of education fell on one Tara Chand, a historian but also an ex-secretary of the Ministry of Education. Professor Majumdar then decided to write independently The History of the Freedom movement in India in three volumes.

Views on the Indian independence movement
When the Government of India set up an editorial Committee to author a history of the freedom struggle of India, he was its principal member. But, following a conflict with the then Education Minister Maulana Abul Kalam Azad on the Sepoy Mutiny, he left the government job and published his own book, The Sepoy Mutiny & Revolt of 1857. According to him the origins of India's freedom struggle lie in the English-educated Indian middle-class and the freedom struggle started with the Banga Bhanga movement in 1905. His views on the freedom struggle are found in his book History of the Freedom Movement in India. He was an admirer of Swami Vivekananda and Ramakrishna Paramahamsa.

Bibliography
The Early History of Bengal, Dacca, 1924.
Champa, Ancient Indian Colonies in the Far East, Vol.I, Lahore, 1927. .
Suvarnadvipa, Ancient Indian Colonies in the Far East, Vol.II, Calcutta, 1938.
The History of Bengal, 1943. .
Kambuja Desa Or An Ancient Hindu Colony In Cambodia, Madras, 1944.
An Advanced History of India. London, 1960. .
The History and Culture of the Indian People, Bombay, 1951–1977 (in eleven volumes).
Ancient India, 1977. .
History of the Freedom movement in India (in three volumes), Calcutta, .
Vakataka – Gupta Age Circa 200–550 A.D., .
Main currents of Indian history, .
Classical accounts of India
Hindu Colonies in the Far East, Calcutta, 1944, .
India and South-East Asia, I.S.P.Q.S. History and Archaeology Series Vol. 6, 1979, .
The History of Ancient Lakshadweep, Calcutta, 1979.
Corporate Life in Ancient India, Calcutta.

See also
 Jadunath Sarkar

References

External links

 Interview with Majumdar
 Remembering Acharya Ramesh Chandra Majumdar: A Century of Spotless Scholarship and Inspiration

1888 births
1980 deaths
People from Faridpur District
Ravenshaw University alumni
Surendranath College alumni
Presidency University, Kolkata alumni
University of Calcutta alumni
Academic staff of the University of Calcutta
Bengali historians
20th-century Indian historians
Historians of South Asia
Vice-Chancellors of the University of Dhaka
Sheriffs of Kolkata
People from Gopalganj District, Bangladesh
Scholars from Kolkata